Clement Greenberg (January 16, 1909 – May 7, 1994), occasionally writing under the pseudonym K. Hardesh, was an American essayist known mainly as an art critic closely associated with American modern art of the mid-20th century and a formalist aesthetician. He is best remembered for his association with the art movement abstract expressionism and the painter Jackson Pollock.

Early life 
Clement Greenberg was born in the borough of the Bronx, NYC, in 1909. His parents were middle-class Jewish immigrants, and he was the eldest of their three sons. Since childhood, Greenberg sketched compulsively, until becoming a young adult, when he began to focus on literature. 
Greenberg attended Erasmus Hall High School, the Marquand School for Boys, then Syracuse University, graduating with an A.B. in 1930, cum laude, Phi Beta Kappa. After college, already as fluent in Yiddish and English since childhood, Greenberg taught himself Italian and German in addition to French and Latin. During the next few years, Greenberg travelled the U.S. working for his father's dry-goods business, but the work did not suit his inclinations, so he turned to working as a translator. Greenberg married in 1934, had a son the next year, and was divorced the year after that. In 1936, Greenberg took a series of jobs with the federal government, from Civil Service Administration, to the Veterans' Administration, and finally to the Appraisers' Division of the Customs Service in 1937. It was then that Greenberg began to write seriously, and soon after began getting published in a handful of small magazines and literary journals.

"Avant-Garde and Kitsch" 
Though his first published essays dealt mainly with literature and theatre, art still held a powerful attraction for Greenberg, so in 1939, he made a sudden name as a visual art writer with possibly his most well-known and oft-quoted essay, "Avant-Garde and Kitsch", first published in the journal Partisan Review. In this Marxist-influenced essay, Greenberg claimed that true avant-garde art is a product of the Enlightenment's revolution of critical thinking, and as such resists and recoils from the degradation of culture in both mainstream capitalist and communist society, while acknowledging the paradox that, at the same time, the artist, dependent on the market or the state, remains inexorably attached "by an umbilical cord of gold". Kitsch, on the other hand, was the product of industrialization and the urbanization of the working class, a filler made for the consumption of the working class: a populace hungry for culture, but without the resources and education to enjoy cutting edge avant garde culture. Greenberg writes,

Kitsch, using for raw material the debased and academicized simulacra of genuine culture, welcomes and cultivates this insensibility. It is the source of its profits. Kitsch is mechanical and operates by formulas. Kitsch is vicarious experience and faked sensations. Kitsch changes according to style, but remains always the same. Kitsch is the epitome of all that is spurious in the life of our times. Kitsch pretends to demand nothing of its customers except their money – not even their time."

For Greenberg, avant garde art was too "innocent" to be effectively used as propaganda or bent to a cause, while kitsch was ideal for stirring up false sentiment.

Greenberg appropriated the German word "kitsch" to describe this low, concocted form of "culture", though its connotations have since been recast to a more affirmative acceptance of nostalgic materials of capitalist/communist culture.

Art history, Abstract Expressionism and after
Greenberg wrote several seminal essays that defined his views on art history in the 20th century.

In 1940, Greenberg joined Partisan Review as an editor. He became art critic for the Nation in 1942. He was associate editor of Commentary from 1945 until 1957.

In December 1950, he joined the government funded American Committee for Cultural Freedom. Greenberg believed Modernism provided a critical commentary on experience. It was constantly changing to adapt to kitsch pseudo-culture, which was itself always developing. In the years after World War II, Greenberg pushed the position that the best avant-garde artists were emerging in America rather than Europe. Particularly, he championed Jackson Pollock as the greatest painter of his generation, commemorating the artist's "all-over" gestural canvases. In the 1955 essay "American-Type Painting" Greenberg promoted the work of Abstract Expressionists, among them Jackson Pollock, Willem de Kooning, Hans Hofmann, Barnett Newman, and Clyfford Still, as the next stage in Modernist art, arguing that these painters were moving towards greater emphasis on the 'flatness' of the picture plane.

Greenberg helped to articulate a concept of medium specificity. It posited that there were inherent qualities specific to each different artistic medium, and part of the Modernist project involved creating artworks that were more and more committed to their particular medium. In the case of painting,  the two-dimensional reality of their medium led to an increasing emphasis on flatness, in contrast with the illusion of depth commonly found in painting since the Renaissance and the invention of pictorial perspective.

In Greenberg's view, after World War II the United States had become the guardian of 'advanced art'. He praised similar movements abroad and, after the success of the Painters Eleven exhibition in 1956 with the American Abstract Artists at New York's Riverside Gallery, he travelled to Toronto to see the group's work in 1957. He was particularly impressed by the potential of painters William Ronald and Jack Bush, and later developed a close friendship with Bush. Greenberg saw Bush's post-Painters Eleven work as a clear manifestation of the shift from abstract expressionism to Color Field painting and Lyrical Abstraction, a shift he had called for in most of his critical writings of the period.

Greenberg expressed mixed feelings about pop art. On the one hand he maintained that pop art partook of a trend toward "openness and clarity as against the turgidities of second generation Abstract Expressionism." But on the other hand Greenberg claimed that pop art did not "really challenge taste on more than a superficial level."

Through the 1960s Greenberg remained an influential figure on a younger generation of critics including Michael Fried and Rosalind E. Krauss. Greenberg's antagonism to "Postmodernist" theories and socially engaged movements in art caused him to become a target for critics who labelled him, and the art he admired, as "old fashioned".

In 1968, Greenberg delivered the inaugural John Power Memorial Lecture at the Power Institute of Fine Arts at the University of Sydney, Australia.

In his book The Painted Word, Tom Wolfe criticized Greenberg along with Harold Rosenberg and Leo Steinberg, whom he dubbed the kings of "Cultureburg". Wolfe argued that these three critics were dominating the world of art with their theories and that, unlike the world of literature in which anyone can buy a book, the art world was controlled by an insular circle of rich collectors, museums and critics with out-sized influence.

Post-painterly abstraction 

Eventually, Greenberg was concerned that some Abstract Expressionism had been "reduced to a set of mannerisms" and increasingly looked to a new set of artists who abandoned such elements as subject matter, connection with the artist, and definite brush strokes. Greenberg suggested this process attained a level of "purity" (a word he only used within scare quotes) that would reveal the truthfulness of the canvas, and the two-dimensional aspects of the space (flatness). Greenberg coined the term Post-Painterly Abstraction to distinguish it from Abstract Expressionism, or Painterly Abstraction, as Greenberg preferred to call it. Post-Painterly Abstraction was a term given to a myriad of abstract art that reacted against gestural abstraction of second-generation Abstract Expressionists. Among the dominant trends in the Post-Painterly Abstraction are Hard-Edged Painters such as Ellsworth Kelly and Frank Stella who explored relationships between tightly ruled shapes and edges, in Stella's case, between the shapes depicted on the surface and the literal shape of the support and Color-Field Painters such as Helen Frankenthaler and Morris Louis, who stained first Magna then water-based acrylic paints into unprimed canvas, exploring tactile and optical aspects of large, vivid fields of pure, open color. The line between these movements is tenuous, however as artists such as Kenneth Noland utilized aspects of both movements in his art. Post-Painterly Abstraction is generally seen as continuing the Modernist dialectic of self-criticism.

Clement Greenberg Collection
In 2000, the Portland Art Museum (PAM) acquired the Clement Greenberg Collection of 159 paintings, prints, drawings, and sculpture by 59 important artists of the late-20th century and early-21st century. PAM exhibits the works primarily in the Jubitz Center for Modern and Contemporary Art – some sculpture resides outdoors. Most of the artists represented are American, along with several Canadians, and a handful of artists of other nationalities. Artists represented in the collection include among others: Edward Avedisian, Walter Darby Bannard, Stanley Boxer, Jack Bush, Anthony Caro, Dan Christensen, Ronald Davis, Richard Diebenkorn, Enrico Donati, Friedel Dzubas, André Fauteux, Paul Feeley, Helen Frankenthaler, Robert Goodnough, Adolph Gottlieb, Hans Hofmann, Wolfgang Hollegha, Robert Jacobsen, Paul Jenkins,  Seymour Lipton, Georges Mathieu, Kenneth Noland, Jules Olitski, William Perehudoff, Jackson Pollock, Larry Poons, William Ronald, Anne Ryan, David Smith, Theodoros Stamos, Anne Truitt, Alfred Wallis, and Larry Zox.

Greenberg's widow, Janice van Horne, donated his annotated library of exhibition catalogues and publications on artists in Greenberg's collection to the Portland Art Museum. Greenberg's annotated library is available at the Portland Art Museum's Crumpacker Family Library which is open to the public free of charge.

In popular culture
Greenberg was portrayed by actor Jeffrey Tambor in the 2000 film Pollock, about the life of Jackson Pollock.

Bibliography
 Greenberg, Clement. Art and Culture, Beacon Press, 1961
 Greenberg, Clement. Late Writings, edited by Robert C. Morgan, St. Paul: University of Minnesota Press, 2003.
 Clement Greenberg: A Critic's Collection by Bruce Guenther, Karen Wilkin (Editor), Portland: Portland Art Museum, 2001.
 Greenberg, Clement. Homemade Esthetics: Observations on Art and Taste. Oxford University Press, 1999.
 Jones, Caroline A. Eyesight Alone: Clement Greenberg's Modernism and the Bureaucratization of the Senses. University of Chicago Press, 2005. 
 Kuspit, Donald. Clement Greenberg: Art Critic. University of Wisconsin, 1979.
 Marquis, Alice Goldfarb. Art Czar: The Rise and Fall of Clement Greenberg. Boston: MFA Publications, 2006.
 O'Brian, John. Clement Greenberg: The Collected Essays and Criticism. 4 vols. Chicago: University of Chicago Press, 1986 and 1993.
 Rubenfeld, Florence. Clement Greenberg: A Life. Scribner, 1997.
 Tekiner, Deniz. "Formalist Art Criticism and the Politics of Meaning." Social Justice, Issue on Art, Power, and Social Change, 33:2 (2006).
 Anatoly Rykov. Clement Greenberg and American theory of contemporary art in the 1960s, in Art History, Journal of the Russian Institute of Art History. 2007, no. 1-2, pp. 538–563.

References

External links

Clement Greenberg – Author page that includes text of many works by Greenberg
Clement Greenberg – Art Critic on The Art Story Foundation website
 Finding aid for Clement Greenberg papers, 1928–1995 The Getty Research Institute, Los Angeles, California.

1909 births
1994 deaths
American art critics
American art collectors
Abstract expressionism
Art Students League of New York alumni
Syracuse University alumni
American people of Lithuanian-Jewish descent
Jewish American journalists
People from the Bronx
Yiddish-speaking people
20th-century American non-fiction writers
Journalists from New York City
Erasmus Hall High School alumni
20th-century American Jews